Bath School may refer to:
Bath Consolidated School, the Michigan school location
Bath School disaster, three bombing attacks in Michigan in 1927
Bath School (Bath, North Carolina), listed on the NRHP in Beaufort County, North Carolina
Bath Local School District, Ohio